Edgars is a Latvian masculine given name. It is the Latvian cognate of the English  name Edgar and may refer to:
Edgars Bergs (born 1984), Latvian discus thrower and shot putter and Paralympic medalist 
Edgars Burlakovs (born 1974), Latvian football midfielder 
Edgars Bertuks (born 1985), Latvian orienteering competitor 
Edgars Eriņš (born 1986), Latvian decathlete
Edgars Gauračs (born 1988),  Latvian footballer
Edgars Jeromanovs (born 1986), Latvian basketball player
Edgars Kļaviņš (born 1993), Latvian ice hockey right player
Edgars Krūmiņš (1909–unknown), Latvian chess player
Edgars Krūmiņš (born 1985), Latvian basketball player
Edgars Lipsbergs (born 1989), Latvian ice hockey forward
Edgars Lūsiņš (born 1984), Latvian ice hockey goaltender 
Edgars Maskalāns (born 1982), Latvian bobsledder 
Edgars Masaļskis (born 1980), Latvian ice hockey goaltender 
Edgars Piksons (born 1983), Latvian biathlete and Olympic competitor
Edgars Rinkēvičs (born 1973), Latvian politician and government official
Edgars Siksna (born 1993), Latvian ice hockey defenceman
Edgars Imants Siliņš, Latvian physicist
Edgars Skuja (born 1966), Latvian diplomat
Edgars Zalāns (born 1967), Latvian politician and architect

Latvian masculine given names